The governor of Michigan, is the head of government of the U.S. state  of Michigan as well as the commander-in-chief of the state's military forces. The governor has a duty to enforce state laws; the power to either approve or veto appropriation bills passed by the Michigan Legislature; the power to convene the legislature; and the power to grant pardons, except in cases of impeachment. The governor is also empowered to reorganize the executive branch of the state government.

In the 17th and 18th century, Michigan was part of French and then British holdings, and administered by their colonial governors. After becoming part of the United States, areas of what is today Michigan were part of the Northwest Territory, Indiana Territory and Illinois Territory, and administered by territorial governors. In 1805, the Michigan Territory was created, and five men served as territorial governors, until Michigan was granted statehood in 1837. Forty-eight individuals have held the position of state governor. The first female governor, Jennifer Granholm, served from 2003 to 2011.

After Michigan gained statehood, governors held the office for a 2-year term, until the 1963 Michigan Constitution changed the term to 4 years. The number of times an individual could hold the office was unlimited until a 1992 constitutional amendment imposed a lifetime term limit of two 4-year governorships. The longest-serving governor in Michigan's history was William Milliken, who was promoted from lieutenant governor after Governor George W. Romney resigned to become Secretary of Housing and Urban Development, then was elected to three further successive terms. The only governors to serve non-consecutive terms were John S. Barry and Frank Fitzgerald.

Governors

Governors of the Territory of Michigan

Michigan Territory was organized on June 30, 1805, from the north half of Indiana Territory. It had three governors appointed by the President of the United States, including the longest-serving governor of any territory, Lewis Cass, who served for 18 years.

Governors of the State of Michigan
Michigan was admitted to the Union on January 26, 1837. The original 1835 Constitution of Michigan provided for the election of a governor and a lieutenant governor every 2 years. The current constitution of 1963 increased this term to four years. There was no term limit on governors until a 1993 constitutional amendment limited governors to two terms.

Should the office of governor become vacant, the lieutenant governor becomes governor, followed in order of succession by the secretary of state and the attorney general. Prior to the current constitution, the duties of the office would devolve upon the lieutenant governor, without that person actually becoming governor. Beginning in 1850, the term begins at noon on January 1 of the year following the election; before, it had no set start date, and terms would last until when their successor was inaugurated, which would be at least the first Monday in January following their election. Prior to the 1963 constitution, the governor and lieutenant governor were elected through separate votes, allowing them to be from different parties. In 1963, this was changed, so that votes are cast jointly for a governor and lieutenant governor of the same party.

See also
Gubernatorial lines of succession in the United States#Michigan

Notes

References
 General

 
 
 

 Constitutions

 Specific

Lists of state governors of the United States
 
Governors